The Grammy Award for Best Male Pop Vocal Performance was a Grammy Award recognizing superior vocal performance by a male in the pop category, the first of which was presented in 1959. It was discontinued after the 2011 Grammy season. The award went to the artist. Singles or tracks only are eligible.

The awards have quite a convoluted history:
From 1959 to 1960 there was an award called Best Vocal Performance, Male, which was for work in the pop field
In 1961 the award was separated into Best Vocal Performance Single Record Or Track and Best Vocal Performance Album, Male
From 1962 to 1963 the awards from the previous year were combined into Best Solo Vocal Performance, Male
From 1964 to 1968 the award was called Best Vocal Performance, Male
In 1969, the awards were combined and streamlined as the award for Best Contemporary-Pop Vocal Performance, Male
From 1970 to 1971 the award was known as Best Contemporary Vocal Performance, Male
From 1972 to 1994 the award was known as Best Pop Vocal Performance, Male
From 1995 to 2011 it was known as Best Male Pop Vocal Performance

The award was discontinued in 2012 in a major overhaul of Grammy categories. From 2012, all solo performances in the pop category (male, female, and instrumental) were shifted to the newly formed Best Pop Solo Performance category.

Sting, Stevie Wonder, and John Mayer, with four wins each, are the artists with the most awards in the category. Elton John is the artist with the most nominations at twelve.

Years reflect the year in which the Grammy Awards were presented, for works released in the previous year.

Recipients

Category records
Most wins

Most nominations

Contemporary (R&R) Performance
In 1966 the Recording Academy established a similar, but different, category in the Pop Field for Best Contemporary (rock & roll) Performances. The category went through a number of changes before being discontinued after the 1968 awards.
In 1966 the award was called Best Contemporary (R&R) Vocal Performance - Male
In 1967 the award from the previous year was combined with the equivalent award for women as the Grammy Award for Best Contemporary (R&R) Solo Vocal Performance - Male or Female
In 1968 the previous award was once again separated by gender, with the male award called Best Contemporary Male Solo Vocal Performance

References

External links 
 Official Site of the Grammy Awards

 
Awards established in 1959
Awards disestablished in 2011
Male Pop Vocal Performance
Male Vocal Performance